The Musee Platinum Open was a professional golf tournament on the Japan Golf Tour. It was played just once, in 2015 at Japan Memorial Golf Club near Miki, Hyōgo Prefecture with a prize fund of ¥100 million.

Winners

External links 
Coverage on the Japan Golf Tour's official site

Former Japan Golf Tour events
Defunct golf tournaments in Japan
Sport in Hyōgo Prefecture
2015 establishments in Japan
2015 disestablishments in Japan